Aldo Mario Aroldi (25 March 1899 – 26 November 1963) was an Italian painter. His work was part of the painting event in the art competition at the 1936 Summer Olympics.

References

1899 births
1963 deaths
20th-century Italian painters
Italian male painters
Olympic competitors in art competitions
People from Casalmaggiore
20th-century Italian male artists